Maria Brink (born December 18, 1977) is an American singer and songwriter, best known as the frontwoman of the metal band  The band has gone on to release seven studio albums and receive four nominations, two from Alternative Press Music Awards, one from Grammy Awards, and one from Loudwire Music Awards.

Brink has been awarded "Rock Goddess of the Year" in the third (2013) and fifth (2015) Annual Loudwire Music Awards, "Hottest Chick in Metal" in 2010, one of eleven women in heavy metal who matter by Yell! Magazine in 2012, and was recognized by Revolver Magazine as one of the "25 Hottest Chicks in Hard Rock & Metal".

Early life
Brink was born on December 18, 1977, in the state of New York, and her father left the family when she was young. Brink's mother introduced her to bands and artists such as Black Sabbath, Patti Smith, and the Rolling Stones. Brink became interested in performing at the age of 5.

Career

Early career
The first band Brink was ever in was an Albany, New York-based band called Pulse, before moving to California. In 2002, when she was 25, she moved to Los Angeles to find a band to work with. Before finding a band, she worked in stores, and sang in coffee shops and bars. In 2004, she met now-band member Chris Howorth at an audition. At first, Howorth rejected Brink for being a woman. Two weeks later, Howorth apologized and hired Brink as the singer. They formed the band Dying Star with drummer Jeff Fabb. They were later joined by guitarist Blake Bunzel and bassist Josh Newell. Soon after, the band changed their name to In This Moment.

In This Moment
Along with her band, she has released seven studio albums. They released their debut album, Beautiful Tragedy, on March 20, 2007. Their second studio album, The Dream, was released on September 30, 2008. The band's third album, A Star-Crossed Wasteland was released July 9, 2010. The band's fourth album titled Blood was released on August 14, 2012. Their fifth studio album titled Black Widow was released on November 17, 2014. Their sixth studio album, Ritual, was released on July 21, 2017. Their seventh studio album, Mother was released on March 27, 2020. Brink has been awarded "Rock Goddess of the Year" in the third (2013) and fifth (2015) Annual Loudwire Music Awards, "Hottest Chick in Metal" in 2010, one of eleven women in heavy metal who matter by Yell! Magazine in 2012, and was recognized by Revolver Magazine as one of the "25 Hottest Chicks in Hard Rock & Metal".

Personal life
At age 15, Brink gave birth to a son, Davion. She worked to support herself and her son as well as helping her mother to overcome a drug addiction. Brink is a vegetarian and active with the PETA campaign. She is also an aspiring artist/painter going by the alias of 'Maria Brink's Wonderland'. Brink was in a relationship with DevilDriver bassist, Jonathan Miller. Brink is currently in a relationship with Ded vocalist Joe Cotela.

Influences
Brink has cited Deftones, Pantera, M83 as some of her favorite bands. She was inspired by vocalists Sarah McLachlan and Phil Anselmo. Outside of music, Brink has cited Queen Elizabeth I, Mother Teresa, Joan of Arc, and her two mothers as the women that influenced her the most.

Discography

In This Moment

Studio albums 
 Beautiful Tragedy (2007)
 The Dream (2008)
 A Star-Crossed Wasteland (2010)
 Blood (2012)
 Black Widow (2014)
 Ritual (2017)
 Mother (2020)

Live albums 
 Blood at the Orpheum (2014)

Compilation albums 
 Rise of the Blood Legion: Greatest Hits (Chapter 1) (2015)

Songs featured on
 "Here's to Us" (Guest Version) – Halestorm
 "Heaven's a Lie" – Manntis
 "Anywhere But Here" – Five Finger Death Punch
 "Big Mouth" – Red Dragon Cartel
 "Contemptress" – Motionless in White
 "Gravity" – Papa Roach
 "Criminal Conversations" – P.O.D.
 "New Devil" – Asking Alexandria

References

External links

 Official website for In This Moment 
 Facebook page

1977 births
Living people
21st-century American women singers
American contraltos
American women heavy metal singers
American women singer-songwriters
American rock songwriters
People from Schenectady, New York
Singer-songwriters from New York (state)
Women in metal
American heavy metal singers